The Ministry of Finance ,  abbreviated MOF, is a ministry of the Government of Somalia that is charged with the responsibility for government expenditure and revenue raising. The ministry's role is to develop economic policy and prepare the  federal budget. The Ministry of Finance also oversees financial legislation and regulation. Each year in October, the Minister of Finance presents the Somali federal budget to the Parliament.

Minister 
The Minister of Finance administers his functions through the Ministry of Finance and a range of other government agencies. The current Minister of Finance is Abdirahman Duale Beyle.

The Minister of Finance is the minister in charge of government revenue and expenditure. The Minister oversees economic policy: fiscal policy is within the Minister's direct responsibility, while monetary policy is implemented by the politically independent Central Bank of Somalia, the head of which is appointed by the President of Somalia. The Minister of Finance also oversees financial legislation and regulation. Each year in October, the Minister of Finance presents the Somalia's federal budget to the Parliament.

The Minister of Finance is a very senior government post; historically, many finance ministers have previously, concurrently or subsequently served as Prime Minister or Deputy Prime Minister.

Ministers of Finance
Salad Abdi Mohamed, 1956 - 1959
Osman Ahmed Roble, 1959 - 1960
Abdulkadir Mohamed Aden "Zoppo", 1960 - 1964
Awil Haji Abdullahi Farah, 1964 - 1966
Ali Omar Shego, 1966 - 1969
Sufi Omar Mohamed, May - October 1969
Mohamed Abdi Arrale, 1969 - 1970
Ibrahim Megag Samatar, 1970 - 1971
Mohamed Yusuf Weirah, 1971 - 1974
Abdirahman Noor Hersi, 1974 - 1978
Mohamed Yusuf Weirah, 1978 - 1980
Abdullahi Ahmed Addow, 1980 - 1984
Mohamed Sheikh Osman, 1984 - 1987
Abdullahi Warsame Nur, February - December 1987
Abdirahman Jama Barre, December 1987 - April 1989
Mohamed Sheikh Osman, April 1989 - February 1990
Mohamed Gelle Yusuf, 1990 - 1991
Sayid Sheikh Dahir, 2000 - 2002
Hussein Mahmud Sheikh Hussein, 2002 - 2006
Hasan Muhammad Nur Shatigadud, 2006 - 2008
Muhammad Ali Hamud, 2008 - 2009
Sharif Hassan Sheikh Aden, 2009 - 2010
Hussein Abdi Halane, 2010 - 2011
Abdinasir Mohamed Abdulle, 2011 - 2012
Mohamud Hassan Suleiman, November 2012 - January 2014
Mohamed Rashid Sheikh Mohamed September 2012-December2013
Hussein Abdi Halane, 2014 - 2015
Mohamud Ibrihim Adan "Fargetti", January 2015 - March 2017
Abdirahman Duale Beyle, March 2017 -

History 
In May 2013, the Somali federal government announced that it had launched a new Public Finance Management Policy (PFMP) in order to streamline the public sector's financial system and to strengthen the delivery capacity of the government's financial sector. Endorsed by the Somali Council of Ministers on May 2, the reform plan has a robust fiduciary framework according to the African Development Bank (AfDB). It is intended to serve as a benchmark for public financial management and the re-establishment of national institutions. The PFMP aims to provide transparent, accurate and timely public sector financial information by ameliorating the national budget process' openness, rendering more efficient and effective public spending, and improving fiscal discipline via both internal and external control. It also sets out to concentrate public expenditure on government priority areas. According to Cabinet members, the policy will cost an estimated $26 million and is expected to be fully implemented over the next four years.

On 17 January 2014, newly appointed Prime Minister of Somalia, Abdiweli Sheikh Ahmed split the ministerial portfolio into Ministry of Finance and Ministry of Planning, respectively.

In February 2014, Minister of Finance Hussein Abdi Halane announced the establishment of a new financial governance committee. The panel is part of an effort by the central authorities to build a more transparent financial system in order to attract additional foreign budget assistance. It will see Somali officials confer with World Bank, International Monetary Fund and African Development Bank representatives, with committee members tasked with providing advice on financial matters. On 29 March 2014, during a parliamentary session, Speaker of the Federal Parliament Mohamed Osman Jawari also announced that all withdrawals from the Central Bank would as of 1 April 2014 require the written approval of the parliamentary finance committee.

In November 2014, the Ministry of Finance launched a new automated Somalia Financial Management Information System (SFMIS) in place of its former manual system. The SFMIS will support reforms made through the Public Finance Management Policy. It aims to strengthen administrative transparency in terms of asset recovery, contracts, concessions and other transactions, and to ameliorate the accuracy, comprehensiveness and timeliness of monetary reports in order to facilitate decision-making. In particular, the system will be centered on registering budget, revenue and expense related data. Electronic financial reports are also slated to be made available through the ministry's official website. The SFMIS' robust IT infrastructure will be installed in all of the Ministry of Finance's offices, as well as in major governmental agencies and partner institutions. Its implementation is funded by the World Bank, and is scheduled to be fully operational in January 2015.

In September 2015, the Ministry of Finance contracted Smart General Services, Ltd., to collect road taxes and vehicle registration fees on behalf of the Federal Government. Despite a standing Government directive that all State revenue be routed to the Treasury Single Account at the Central Bank of Somalia, the taxes and fees generated by Smart General Services were deposited into a private account at Salaam Somali Bank in Mogadishu. The net revenue, once the company had deducted its 40 per cent share, was intended to be transferred from Salaam Somali Bank to the Treasury Single Account every 15 days. The UN Somalia and Eritrea Monitoring Group found that, instead, only $62,648 (4.2 per cent) of the $1,481,695 generated by Smart General Services from August 2016 to May 2017 was ever transferred to the Treasury Single Account. Moreover, revenue was transferred inconsistently and with irregularities. There were public accusations in August 2016 that "Fargetti", the Minister at the time, had embezzled large sums from the tax receipts.

Structure

 Director-General
 Under the Authority of Director-General 
 National Strategy Unit 
 Legal Division
 Corporate Strategy and Communications Division
 Treasury Internal Audit Division
 Integrity Unit
 Administration Division
 Human resources Division
 Deputy Director-General (Policy)
 National Budget Office
 International Division
 Fiscal and Economics Division
 Tax Division
 Registrar Office of Credit Reporting Agencies 
 Deputy Secretary-General (Management)
 Management Division
 Government Procurement Division
 Information Technology Division 
 Deputy Director-General (Investment)
 Strategic Investment Division
 Statutory Body Strategic Management Division
 Government Investment Companies Division 
 Public Asset Management Division
 Accountant General
Treasury
Customs Department

See also
Central Bank of Somalia

References

Somalia
Government ministries of Somalia